Anna Rutherford (27 November 1932 – 21 February 2001) was an Australian-born academic and publisher, who helped to establish the field of post-colonial literature in Europe.

Biography
Rutherford was born in Australia in Mayfield, Newcastle, New South Wales.

From 1968 to 1996 she was Director of the Commonwealth Literature Centre at the University of Aarhus, Denmark, where she introduced African and West Indian courses, organising in 1971 the first European conference on the British Commonwealth novel.

In 1979, she founded Kunapipi: Journal of Postcolonial Writing & Culture and was its editor until her death. The name derives from kunapipi, a mother goddess in Aboriginal Australian mythology.

Rutherford also founded and was director of the small publishing company Dangaroo Press.

In 1996 an edited collection, A talent(ed) digger, was published in Rutherford's memory.

Works
 (ed. with Donald Hannah) Commonwealth Short Stories. London: Edward Arnold, 1971.
 (ed. with Kirsten Holst Petersen) Cowries and Kobos: the West African oral tale and short story. Mundelstrup, Denmark: Dangaroo Press, 1981.
 Silas Marner: Notes. Harlow: Longman, 1981. York Notes, 98.
 George Eliot, Middlemarch: Notes. Harlow: Longman, 1985. York Notes, 260.
 (ed. with Kirsten Holst Petersen) A Double Colonization: Colonial and Post-colonial Women's Writing. Mundelstrup, Denmark; Oxford: Dangaroo Press, 1986.
 (ed.) Aboriginal Culture Today. Sydney: Dangaroo Press, 1988.
 (ed. with Kirsten Holst Petersen) Displaced Persons. Sydney: Dangaroo Press, 1988.
 (ed. with Hena Maes-Jelinek and Kirsten Holst Petersen) A Shaping of Connections: Commonwealth literature studies, then and now: essays in honour of A.N. Jeffares. Sydney, N.S.W.: Dangaroo Press, 1989.
 (ed. with Kirsten Holst Petersen) Chinua Achebe: a celebration. Oxford: Heinemann, 1990.
 (ed. with Kirsten Holst Petersen) On Shifting Sands: new art and literature from South Africa. Earlsdon: Dangaroo Press, 1991.
 (ed.) From Commonwealth to Post-colonial. Sydney; Coventry: Dangaroo, 1992.
 (ed.) Populous Places: Australia's cities and towns. Sydney; Coventry: Dangaroo, 1992.
 (ed. with Shirley Chew) Unbecoming Daughters of the Empire.  Sydney, N.S.W.: Dangaroo Press, 1993.
 (ed. with Lars Jensen and Shirley Chew) Into the Nineties: post-colonial women's writing. Armidale, N.S.W.: Dangaroo Press, 1994.
 (ed. with Susheila Nasta) Tiger's Triumph: Celebrating Sam Selvon. Armidale, N.S.W.; Hebden Bridge: Dangaroo, 1995.
 (ed. with Anne Collett and Lars Jensen) Teaching Post-colonialism and Post-colonial Literatures. Aarhus, Denmark; Oakville, Conn.: Aarhus University Press, 1997.
 (ed. with James Wieland) War: Australia's Creative Response. St. Leonards, NSW, Australia: Allen & Unwin, 1997.

References

1932 births
2001 deaths
Australian publishers (people)
Literary scholars